94.1 Magik FM (DWVN 94.1 MHz) is an FM station owned and operated by Century Broadcasting Network. Its studios and transmitter are located at Quezon Ave., Vigan.

References

External links
Magik FM Vigan FB Page

Radio stations in Ilocos Sur
Radio stations established in 1992